The 2013 McDonald's Burnie International was a professional tennis tournament played on hard courts. It was the eleventh edition of the tournament which was part of the 2013 ATP Challenger Tour and the 2013 ITF Women's Circuit. It took place in Burnie, Australia, on 28 January – 3 February 2013.

Men's singles main draw entrants

Seeds 

 1 Rankings as of 14 January 2013

Other entrants 
The following players received wildcards into the singles main draw:
  Jay Andrijic
  Harry Bourchier
  Bradley Mousley
  Andrew Whittington

The following players received entry from the qualifying draw:
  James Lemke
  Michael Look
  Jordan Thompson
  Michael Venus

The following player received entry as a lucky loser:
  Ryan Agar

Men's doubles main draw entrants

Seeds 

1 Rankings as of 14 January 2013

Other entrants 
The following pairs received wildcards into the doubles main draw:
  Jay Andrijic /  Bradley Mousley
  Harry Bourchier /  Omar Jasika
  Jacob Grills /  Andrew Whittington

Women's singles main draw entrants

Seeds 

 Rankings as of 14 January 2013

Other entrants 
The following players received wildcards into the singles main draw:
  Camilla Rosatello
  Priscilla Hon
  Abbie Myers
  Belinda Woolcock

The following players received entry from the qualifying draw:
  Azra Hadzic
  Allie Kiick
  Anett Kontaveit
  Jessica Moore
  Tammi Patterson
  Viktorija Rajicic
  Mari Tanaka
  Emily Webley-Smith

The following player received entry into the singles main draw as a Lucky Loser:
  Stephanie Bengson

Champions

Men's singles 

  John Millman def.  Stéphane Robert, 6–2, 4–6, 6–0

Men's doubles 

  Ruan Roelofse /  John-Patrick Smith def.  Brydan Klein /  Dane Propoggia 6–2, 6–2

Women's singles 

  Olivia Rogowska def.  Monique Adamczak, 7–6(7–5), 6–7(7–9), 6–4

Women's doubles 

  Shuko Aoyama /  Erika Sema def.  Bojana Bobusic /  Jessica Moore by walkover

External links 
 Official website

2013
2013 ATP Challenger Tour
2013 ITF Women's Circuit
2013 in Australian tennis